"Just Dippin'" is song by American West Coast hip hop recording artist Snoop Dogg,  taken from his fourth studio album, No Limit Top Dogg (1999). It was produced by Dr. Dre and features guest appearances by Dr. Dre and Jewell. This is the first time they collaborated since Doggystyle and Dr. Dre's The Chronic.

Track listing 
CD single
Just Dippin' (Radio Version) (featuring  Dr. Dre and Jewell) — 4:02
Just Dippin' (Instrumental Version) — 4:03

Vinyl Remix
Just Dippin' (Remix) (Radio Version) — 3:51
Just Dippin' (Remix) (Instrumental Version) — 4:15
Just Dippin' (Remix) (Club Mix) — 4:15
Just Dippin' (Remix) (A Cappella Version) — 4:13

References

1999 songs
Snoop Dogg songs
Songs written by Snoop Dogg
Songs written by Dr. Dre
Dr. Dre songs
Song recordings produced by Dr. Dre
Gangsta rap songs
G-funk songs